Michael Thomas Clingly (18 April 1932 – 16 August 2004) was an Australian rules footballer who played for West Torrens in the South Australian National Football League (SANFL). He also represented South Australia at Sheffield Shield cricket.

Clingly played mainly at either centre half forward or centre half back. He was West Torrens's leading goal-kicker three times during his career and was voted best afield from the back pocket in their 1953 premiership team. In a game against Glenelg, in 1956, Clingly kicked 12 goals and became the last player in the league to use the place kick.

His five first-class cricket matches for South Australia were spent as a left-arm medium-pacer. He took nine wickets at 54.33 with a best of 3 for 15 against Queensland at the Adelaide Oval.

On 16 August 2004, Clingly died after suffering a heart attack.

See also
 List of South Australian representative cricketers

References

External links

Cricinfo: Michael Clingly

1932 births
2004 deaths
West Torrens Football Club players
Australian cricketers
South Australia cricketers
Cricketers from Adelaide
Australian rules footballers from Adelaide